El grito de Celina (Celina's Cry) is a 1983 Argentine romantic drama film directed by Mario David, who also wrote the script, which is based on a short story by Bernardo Kordon. It stars  María Rosa Gallo, Selva Alemán, Miguel Ángel Solá and María Vaner. Víctor Proncet composed the soundtrack. 
The film was shot in 1975, but it didn't premiere until May 1983 due to military government disapproval and censorship at the time.

Plot
A mother confronts the young woman who is going to marry her youngest son.

Cast

  María Rosa Gallo as Juliana
  Selva Alemán as Celina
  Miguel Ángel Solá as Antonio
  María Vaner as Roberta
  Pablo Alarcón as Pedro
  Aldo Barbero as El hombre
  Alba Mujica as Rosalía
  David Llewellyn as Carancho
  Edith Gaute
  Juan Carlos de Seta as the drunkard
  Roberto Pieri as old man
  María Bufano as Hermana de Celina
  Sara Suter 
  Ramón Perello as man in bar
  Jorge Ochoa 
  Raúl Manso 
  Tatiana Robi
  Roberto Doménico
  Eduardo Thau
  Patricia Luján
  Sergio Birnadussi
  Gabriel D. Lentini
  S. M. Birnadussi

Production
The film was produced by executive producer Eduardo Thau. The screenplay was written by the director Mario David, based on the short story Los ojos de Celina by Bernardo Kordon. Cinematographer Adelqui Camusso was hired to shoot the film. Víctor Proncet composed the soundtrack, while the editing was done by Oscar Pariso.

Reception
The film was shot in 1975 but because the content and actors were not to the liking of the military government at the time, the film was censored and blocked from release. It didn't reach cinemas in Buenos Aires until 26 May 1983. The film was critically acclaimed upon release, with Daniel López in La Voz del Interior labelling it "Kordon and David's remarkable speech on despotism". Hugo Paredero in Humor described the actors as "very talented, all deserving", surmising that they must have had "inner drama" to be so convincing to the camera. Jorge Miguel Couselo in Clarín described it as a "compelling movie" and stated that there are "no decorations". In their 2001 book  Un diccionario de films argentinos (1930-1995), Raúl Manrupe and María Alejandra Portela were less favorable, writing: "Rural matriarchy, rustic beings and critical intention against authoritarianism, in a rather static and outdated realization".

See also
List of Argentine films of 1983

References

External links
 

1983 films
1980s Spanish-language films
Argentine romantic drama films
1983 drama films
Films directed by Mario David